Qinnan District is a district of the city of Qinzhou, Guangxi, China.

County-level divisions of Guangxi
Qinzhou